is a railway station on the Odakyu Odawara Line in Shibuya-ku, Tokyo, Japan, operated by the private railway operator Odakyu Electric Railway.

Station layout
The station has two side platforms serving two tracks.

Platforms

History

On 1 July 1931, it was renamed , and on 1 May 1942, it became Minami-Shinjuku.

Station numbering was introduced to the Odakyu terminal in 2014 with Minami-Shinjuku being assigned station number OH02.

Surrounding area

 Odakyu Minami-Shinjuku Building (Former Odakyu Head Office Building)
 Odakyu Southern tower
 Yoyogi Station (Yamanote Line, Chūō-Sōbu Line, Toei Oedo Line)
 Shinjuku Station

References

External links

 Minami-Shinjuku Station information (Odakyu) 

Odakyu Odawara Line
Stations of Odakyu Electric Railway
Railway stations in Tokyo
Railway stations in Japan opened in 1927